The year 1932 was marked by many events that left an imprint on the history of Soviet and Russian Fine Arts.

Events
 April 23 — The Central committee of the Communist party of USSR adopted a resolution "On the Restructuring of Literary and Artistic Organizations", which provided for the dissolution of the existing literature and art groups and the formation of unified creative unions.
 June 25 — The Moscow Union of Soviet Artists was founded. The Board included Sergei Gerasimov, Alexander Deyneka, Konstantin Yuon, David Shterenberg, Pavel Kuznetsov, and other important Soviet artists.
 August 2 — The Leningrad Union of Soviet Artists was founded. The first Chairman of the Board to be elected was artist Kuzma Petrov-Vodkin.
 Alexander Samokhvalov created his famous painting "Girl in a T-shirt." In 1937 on the International Art Exhibition in Paris, the painting was awarded a gold medal.

Births
 April 28 — Igor Suvorov, Russian Soviet painter.
 May 14 — Yuri Khukhrov, Russian Soviet painter (died 2003).
 August 23 — Valentina Monakhova, Russian Soviet painter, graphic artist, and art teacher.

See also

 List of Russian artists
 List of painters of Leningrad Union of Artists
 Saint Petersburg Union of Artists
 Russian culture
 1932 in the Soviet Union

References

Sources
 Художники РСФСР за 15 лет. Каталог юбилейной выставки живописи, графики, скульптуры. Л., ГРМ, 1932.
 Выставка ленинградских художников. «Красная газета» (вечерний выпуск), Ленинград, 1932, № 108, С. 3.
 Artists of Peoples of the USSR. Biobibliography Dictionary. Vol. 1. Moscow, Iskusstvo, 1970.
 Artists of Peoples of the USSR. Biobibliography Dictionary. Vol. 2. Moscow, Iskusstvo, 1972.
 Directory of Members of Union of Artists of USSR. Volume 1,2. Moscow, Soviet Artist Edition, 1979.
 Directory of Members of the Leningrad branch of the Union of Artists of Russian Federation. Leningrad, Khudozhnik RSFSR, 1980.
 Artists of Peoples of the USSR. Biobibliography Dictionary. Vol. 4 Book 1. Moscow, Iskusstvo, 1983.
 Directory of Members of the Leningrad branch of the Union of Artists of Russian Federation. - Leningrad: Khudozhnik RSFSR, 1987.
 Персональные и групповые выставки советских художников. 1917-1947 гг. М., Советский художник, 1989.
 Artists of peoples of the USSR. Biobibliography Dictionary. Vol. 4 Book 2. - Saint Petersburg: Academic project humanitarian agency, 1995.
 Link of Times: 1932 - 1997. Artists - Members of Saint Petersburg Union of Artists of Russia. Exhibition catalogue. - Saint Petersburg: Manezh Central Exhibition Hall, 1997.
 Matthew C. Bown. Dictionary of 20th Century Russian and Soviet Painters 1900-1980s. - London: Izomar, 1998.
 Vern G. Swanson. Soviet Impressionism. - Woodbridge, England: Antique Collectors' Club, 2001.
 Sergei V. Ivanov. Unknown Socialist Realism. The Leningrad School. - Saint-Petersburg: NP-Print Edition, 2007. - , .
 Anniversary Directory graduates of Saint Petersburg State Academic Institute of Painting, Sculpture, and Architecture named after Ilya Repin, Russian Academy of Arts. 1915 - 2005. - Saint Petersburg: Pervotsvet Publishing House, 2007.

Art
Soviet Union